A gripe site is a type of website that is dedicated to critique or complaint about a specific subject. The subject could be a person, place, politician, corporation, institution, or something else. A gripe site may aim to offer constructive criticism to the subject (like an open letter), or may simply lampoon the subject.

See also
royaldutchshellplc.com

References
Rise of the gripe site  Prospect magazine, February 2007

External links
cybergriping.com
webgripesites.com
weeklygripe.co.uk
gripes.com.au

Consumer protection
Websites